Gus Craig (January 25, 1920 – October 18, 2008) was an American politician. He served as a Democratic member of the Florida House of Representatives from 1959 to 1980.

Life and career 
Craig was born in St. Augustine, Florida, the son of Willie Mae and Augustus Hendrick Craig. He attended Ketterlinus High School, the University of Florida and Cincinnati College of Mortuary Science.

Craig served in the United States Navy. In 1959, he was elected to the Florida House of Representatives. Craig was president pro tempore for two years. He left office in 1980.

Craig died in October 2008 at his home in St. Augustine, Florida, at the age of 88.

References 

1920 births
2008 deaths
People from St. Augustine, Florida
Democratic Party members of the Florida House of Representatives
20th-century American politicians
University of Florida alumni
Cincinnati College of Mortuary Science alumni